On the morning of August 29, 2016, the Islamic State of Iraq and the Levant conducted a powerful car suicide bombing on an army camp in Aden, Yemen, killing 72 and wounding 67. The attack took place as new military recruits were signing up in a local government school. Despite Al-Qaeda's large presence in the area, the Islamic State of Iraq and the Levant were the only ones to claim responsibility for the bombing.

ISIS claimed responsibility and referred to the bombing as a "martyrdom operation".

Incident
On 29 August 2016, recruits at an army training camp had queued in line for breakfast, which was brought into the compound by a truck. According to military sources, the recruitment was for the Yemeni and Saudi Arabian led coalition army, fighting the Huthi rebels at the northern border with Saudi Arabia.

The suicide bomber, a suspected member of the Islamic State of Iraq and the Levant, entered the compound behind this truck. He then drove his vehicle into the gathering of people, blowing himself up in a suicide car bomb attack and killing himself.
The blast also caused a roof to collapse, burying recruits beneath it.

See also
List of terrorist incidents, 2016
Yemeni Civil War (2014–present)
23 May 2016 Yemen bombings
June 2016 Mukalla attacks
May 2016 Yemen police bombings

References

2016 murders in Yemen
2016 in military history
2016 murders in Asia
Suicide car and truck bombings in Yemen
Yemeni Civil War (2014–present)
Islamic State of Iraq and the Levant in Yemen
Islamic terrorist incidents in 2016
August 2016 crimes in Asia
Terrorist incidents in Yemen in 2016
Mass murder in 2016
21st century in Aden
Suicide bombings in 2016